Kambi may refer to:

 Kambi Group, a sports betting company
 Kambi, is a slang in Malayalam language referring to sensual contents of an erotic nature mainly in television, movies & publications.
 Kampoi, village in Greece